Florence Edenshaw Davidson (1896–1993) was a Canadian First Nations artist from the Haida. She created basketry and button-blankets and was a respected elder in her village of Masset, Haida Gwaii, British Columbia.

Early life 
Florence Edenshaw was born in Masset on September 15, 1896, the daughter of the Haida artist Charles Edenshaw (Chief Idɨnsaw) and his wife Isabella (K'woiyəng).  She was given the Haida name Jadał q'egəngá ("Story Maid"). As a child, she help her mother to sew button blankets.

She was of the Raven moiety, of the Y'akwə'lanas lineage, and of the Shark House (Q'ad Nas), with crests that included Shark, Two-Finned Killerwhale, and Brown Bear.

Personal life 
She married Robert Davidson (1880–1969), a Haida, on February 23, 1911, and had 13 children. Her daughter Primrose Adams, also an artist, was the 2011 recipient of the Creative Lifetime Achievement Award for First Nations' Art.

Career 
Davidson became renowned for her blankets and for her spruce-root and cedar baskets.

In the 1960s she was consultant on Haida culture and Masset history to the writer Christie Harris, author of Raven's Cry. She was also a major consultant on Haida language to John Enrico.

She became well known through her collaborative autobiography written with the anthropologist Margaret B. Blackman, published in 1982.

Death and legacy 
Davidson died December 13, 1993. Her artistic legacy continues with her grandsons, the brother Reg Davidson and Robert Davidson, who are woodcarvers and sculptors.

References

Further reading 
 Blackman, Margaret B. (1982; rev. ed., 1992) During My Time: Florence Edenshaw Davidson, a Haida Woman.  Seattle: University of Washington Press. 
 Harris, Christie (1966) Raven's Cry.  New York: Atheneum.  (Revised edition, Vancouver, Douglas & McIntyre, 1992.)
 Jensen, Doreen, and Polly Sargent (1986) Robes of Power: Totem Poles on Cloth.  Vancouver: University of British Columbia Press. 
 Macnair, Peter L., Alan L. Hoover, and Kevin Neary (1984) The Legacy: Tradition and Innovation in Northwest Coast Indian Art.  Vancouver, B.C.: Douglas & McIntyre. 

1896 births
1993 deaths
20th-century Canadian women artists
20th-century First Nations people
First Nations basket weavers
First Nations textile artists
Haida artists
Women basketweavers
Women textile artists
First Nations women artists